Skafunkrastapunk is the debut album by American ska punk band Skankin' Pickle, released in 1991 on Dill Records and subsequently re-issued in 1995.

Track listing
All songs written by Skankin' Pickle except where otherwise noted.

 "Road Zombie" - 2:07
 "It's Not Too Late" (live) - 3:02
 "Doin Something Naughty" - 4:00
 "Hulk Hogan" (live) - 2:03
 "Racist World" - 5:08
 "Burnt Head" (live) - 1:47
 "Asian Man" - 3:29
 "Ska" (live) - 2:53
 "Fights" - 4:04
 "How Funk!" (live) - 7:50
 "Fakin Jamaican" (Steve Devlin) - 2:26
 "24 Second Song" (live) - 0:43
 "You Shouldn't Judge a Man by the Hair on his Butt!!" - 5:51
 "Peter Piper & Mary" (live) - 2:24

Personnel

Skankin' Pickle
Lynette Knackstedt - guitar, vocals, lead vocals on track 5
Chuck "Mod" Phelps - drums
Mike "Mr. Clean" Mattingly - bass guitar, vocals, lead vocals on track 3, 6, 10, 13 and 14
Lars "Slim" Nylander - trombone, vocals
Gerry Lundquist - trombone, vocals, lead vocals on track 4
Mike "Bruce Lee" Park - saxophone, vocals, lead vocals on track 2, 7, 9, 11 and 12

Additional musicians
Roland Alphonso - tenor saxophone on "Racist World"
Robert Barry - Hammond organ

References

1991 debut albums
Skankin' Pickle albums